In financial markets, an option naming convention is a method of identifying which of many possible options is being quoted or traded.

Standard Equity Option Convention
US equity options, typically cleared by the Options Clearing Corporation, underwent an initiative between 2008 and 2010 to change the standard symbology. The proposed revision was meant to address several deficiencies with the old standard convention described below. In particular:

Lack of uniformity for LEAP option convention (i.e. options with maturity greater than one year)
Use of illogical identifiers for both options and underliers
Difficulties encountered when rolling LEAP options to standard options as they age.
Ambiguous naming, such as when options for both 105 strike and 205 strike exist on the same expiration for an underlier.

The new symbology does away with the letter codes for strike and expiration, and instead employ a 21-byte series key in the style of Root symbol (ticker symbol) + Expiration Year (yy) + Expiration Month (mm) + Expiration Day (dd) + Call/Put Indicator (C or P) + Strike Price:

Symbol (max. 6 characters)
Yr (YY)
Mo (MM)
Day (DD)
Call or Put (C/P)
Strike Price (#####.###) listed with five digits before the decimal and three digits following the decimal

For Example, an April 16, 2015 $30.00 Call Option on Yahoo would be listed as "YHOO150416C00030000".

All options that settle into the same underlier (e.g. 100 shares of the underlier) share the same symbol field.

Old convention
Prior to 2010, standard equity option naming convention in North America, as used by the Options Clearing Corporation, was as follows:

For example, an Apple Inc AAPL.O call option that would have expired in December 2007 at a $122.50 strike price would be displayed as APVLZ in old convention (AAPL071222C00122500 in new convention).

Stock option names are written in the following format: SYMBOL+MONTH+STRIKE
SYMBOL = Option Root Symbol, normally the stock's ticker symbol
MONTH = Month the option expires
STRIKE = Strike price

Expiration Month Codes

Strike Price Codes

References

 
Investment
Option naming convention